Paul Lir Alexander, also known as El Parito Loco, is a Brazilian drug lord. He is one of the richest drug lords in Brazil, having a net worth of more than $170 million.

Biography
Alexander was born in Santa Catarina and joined military service in the Israeli Army and the Mossad. He later worked as a Drug Enforcement Administration (DEA) agent before becoming the leader of a drug-smuggling ring in Brazil. He was reported to have been among the wealthiest of Rio de Janeiro's drug lords, with an estimated $20 million in assets, primarily in the form of real estate. Alexander specialized in sending cocaine to the United States inside electrical transformers. He owned various ranches in Brazil, his own business jet and a yacht worth $25 million.

Alexander was arrested by the DEA in 1993 and spent 17 years in prison. He was arrested again in Brazil and sentenced to 42 years' imprisonment before disappearing while on a temporary release from a Brazilian prison in 2010.

References

Brazilian drug traffickers
Brazilian prisoners and detainees
1956 births
Living people
Brazilian gangsters